2APH is a radio station based in Albury-Wodonga.  It is part of the Vision Australia Radio network, a reading and information service for those persons unable to read or easily access information in print. The station is operated by volunteers.

When not broadcasting local programs, the station is a relay of 3RPH in Melbourne.

References 

Radio stations in New South Wales
Radio stations in Victoria
Radio reading services of Australia